Cynthia Lynne Cooper-Dyke (born April 14, 1963) is an American basketball coach and former player who has won championships in college, in the Olympics, and in the Women's National Basketball Association (WNBA). She is considered by many as one of the greatest basketball players ever. In 2011, Cooper-Dyke was voted by fans as one of the Top 15 players in WNBA history. Upon the league's formation, she played for the Houston Comets from 1997 to 2000, being named the Most Valuable Player of the WNBA Finals in all four seasons, and returned to play again in 2003. Cooper-Dyke still holds the record for most Finals MVPs with four. On April 30, 2019, she was introduced as the head coach for the Texas Southern Lady Tigers basketball team, a position she held in the 2012–13 season. She has also coached at USC, UNC Wilmington, Prairie View A&M, and, professionally, for the Phoenix Mercury. Cooper-Dyke was inducted into the Women's Basketball Hall of Fame in 2009 and the Naismith Memorial Basketball Hall of Fame in 2010.

Early years

High school
Cooper attended Locke High School before enrolling at the University of Southern California. Cooper participated athletically in both track and field as well as basketball. She led her team to the California State Championship (4A) scoring an average of 31 points per game, and scoring 44 points in one game. Cooper was named the Los Angeles Player of the Year.

College
Cooper was a four-year letter winner at guard for USC from 1982 to 1986. She led the Women of Troy to NCAA appearances in all four years, Final Four appearances in three of her four years, and back-to-back NCAA tournament titles in 1983 and 1984. After the 1984 Championship, she briefly left school, but was persuaded to return. She completed four years with USC, although she did not graduate. Cooper closed out her collegiate career with an appearance in the 1986 NCAA tournament championship game and a spot on the NCAA Final Four All-Tournament Team. Cooper ranks eighth on USC's all-time scoring list with 1,559 points, fifth in assists (381) and third in steals (256). While Cooper was at USC, the Women of Troy compiled a record of 114–15.  She earned her bachelor's degree from Prairie View A&M University in 2005.

USC statistics
Source

Career

Team USA
Cooper was named to represent the US at the 1981 William Jones Cup competition in Taipei, Taiwan, while still in high school. The team won seven of eight games to win the silver medal for the event. Cooper scored 2.8 points per game and recorded nine steals.

Cooper was selected to represent the US at the inaugural Goodwill games, held in Moscow in July 1986. North Carolina State's Kay Yow served as head coach. The team opened up with a 72–53 win over Yugoslavia, and followed that with a 21-point win over Brazil 91–70.  The third game was against Czechoslovakia and would be much closer. Cheryl Miller was the scoring leader in this game, scoring 26 points to help the US to a 78–70 victory.  The US faced Bulgaria in the semi-final match up, and again won, this time 67–58. This set up the final against the Soviet Union, led by 7-foot-2 Ivilana Semenova, considered the most dominant player in the world. The Soviet team, had a 152–2 record in major international competition over the prior three decades, including an 84–82 win over the US in the 1983 World Championships. The Soviets held the early edge, leading 21–19 at one time, before the US went on a scoring run to take a large lead they did not relinquish.  The final score was 83–60 in favor of the US, earning the gold medal for the US squad.  Cooper averaged 2.0 points per game.

Cooper continued to represent the US with the national team at the 1986 World Championship, held in Moscow, a month after the Goodwill Games in Moscow.  The US team was even more dominant this time.  The early games were won easily, and the semifinal against Canada, while the closest game for the US so far, ended up an 82–59 victory.  At the same time, the Soviet team was winning easily as well, and the final game pitted two teams each with 6–0 records. The Soviet team, having lost only once at home, wanted to show that the Goodwill games setback was a fluke.  The US team started by scoring the first eight points, and raced to a 45–23 lead, although the Soviets fought back and reduced the halftime margin to 13.  The US went on a 15–1 run in the second half to out the game away, and ended up winning the gold medal with a score of 108–88.  Cooper averaged 5.9 points per game.

Cooper played for USA Basketball as part of the 1987 USA Women's Pan American Team which won a gold medal in Indianapolis, Indiana.  Cooper was a member of the gold medalist 1988 US Olympic Women's Basketball Team., and the Bronze Medal team in 1992.

International
Cooper played for several teams in the European leagues:
 Samoa Bétera (Spain) 1986–1987 (36.7 ppg)
 Parma (Italy) 1987–1994
 Alcamo (Italy) 1994–1996

During her time playing for Samoa Bétera, a Spanish team, she was the league leading scorer with 36.7 ppg. During the almost ten years she played in the Italian leagues, she was the league's leading scorer eight times, and finished second the other two years.

In 1987, she was the MVP of the European All-Star team. She was also named to the All-Star team of the Italian leagues in 1996–1997.

WNBA
At the age of 34, Cooper signed to play with the Houston Comets. She led the league in scoring three consecutive years, shocking the franchise to a record four WNBA Championships.  In addition, she was voted the WNBA's MVP in 1997 and 1998 and named Most Valuable Player in each of those four WNBA Finals. Cooper was named the 1998 Sportswoman of the Year (in the team category) by the Women's Sports Foundation. During the Comet dynasty, she was a vital part of the triple threat offense with Sheryl Swoopes and Tina Thompson. When retired in 2000, Cooper became the first player in WNBA history to score 500, 1,000, 2,000 and 2,500 career points. She scored 30 or more points in 16 of her 120 games and had a 92-game double-figure scoring streak from 1997 to 2000. She went on to coach the Phoenix Mercury for one and a half seasons (2001–2002).

Cooper returned as an active player in the 2003 season, but announced her final retirement from professional basketball in 2004. Her appearance in the game, as a 40-year-old, made her the oldest player, at the time, to play in a WNBA game.

Afterward, she served as a TV analyst and halftime reporter for the Houston Rockets of the NBA.
Cooper has also been named one of the top 15 players in the WNBA at the 2011 WNBA All-Star game. During Game 1 of the 2016 WNBA Finals, she was named in the WNBA Top 20@20.

Career statistics

Regular season

|-
|style="text-align:left;background:#afe6ba;"| 1997†
| style="text-align:left;"| Houston
| 28 || 28 || 35.1 || .470 || .414 || .864 || 4.0 || 4.7 || 2.1 || 0.2 || 3.89 || style="background:#D3D3D3" | 22.2°
|-
|style="text-align:left;background:#afe6ba;"|1998†
| style="text-align:left;"| Houston
| 30 || 30 || 35.0 || .446 || .400 || .854 || 3.7 || 4.4 || 1.6 || 0.4 || 3.17 || style="background:#D3D3D3" | 22.7°
|-
|style="text-align:left;background:#afe6ba;"| 1999†
| style="text-align:left;"| Houston
| 31 || 31 || 35.5 || .463 || .335 || .891 || 2.8 || 5.2 || 1.4 || 0.4 || 3.35 || style="background:#D3D3D3" | 22.1°
|-
|style="text-align:left;background:#afe6ba;"| 2000†
| style="text-align:left;"| Houston
| 31 || 31 || 35.0 || .459 || .355 || .875 || 2.7 || 5.0 || 1.3 || 0.2 || 3.19 || 17.7
|-
| style="text-align:left;"| 2003
| style="text-align:left;"| Houston
| 4 || 4 || 36.0 || .421 || .389 || .893 || 2.5 || 5.5 || 1.0 || 0.3 || 3.50 || 16.0
|-
| style="text-align:left;"| Career
| style="text-align:left;"|5 years, 1 team
| 124 || 124 || bgcolor="EOCEF2" |35.2  || .459 || .377 || .871 || 3.2 || 4.9 || 1.6 || 0.3 || 3.40 || bgcolor="EOCEF2" |  21.0

Playoffs

|-
|style="text-align:left;background:#afe6ba;"|1997
| style="text-align:left;"| Houston
| 2 || 2 || 38.5 || .533 || .400 || .741 || 4.5 || 4.5 || 1.5 || 0.5 || 3.50 || style="background:#D3D3D3" | 28.0°
|-
|style="text-align:left;background:#afe6ba;"|1998
| style="text-align:left;"| Houston
| 5 || 5 || style="background:#D3D3D3" | 39.6° || .452 || .250 || .844 || 3.2 || 4.4 || 1.8 || 1.0 || 3.00 || style="background:#D3D3D3" | 25.8°
|-
|style="text-align:left;background:#afe6ba;"|1999†
| style="text-align:left;"| Houston
| 6 || 6 || 36.7 || .388 || .324 || .865 || 4.3 || 6.8 || 1.5 || 1.0 || 3.33 || 20.3
|-
|style="text-align:left;background:#afe6ba;"| 2000†
| style="text-align:left;"| Houston
| 6 || 6 || 38.0 || .378 || .344 || .897 || 2.5 || 3.7 || 1.5 || 0.2 || 3.00 || style="background:#D3D3D3" | 22.8°
|-
| style="text-align:left;"| Career
| style="text-align:left;"|4 years, 1 team
| 19 || 19 || 38.1 || .416 || .317 || .847 || 3.5 || 4.9 || 1.6 || 0.7 || 3.16 || bgcolor="EOCEF2" | 23.3

College coaching career

Prairie View A&M (2005–2010)
In May 2005, Cooper was named the head coach of the women's basketball team at Prairie View A&M University. In her second season in 2006–07, Cooper-Dyke led the underdog Panthers to their first SWAC women's basketball tournament title and NCAA tournament appearance. Cooper-Dyke was named SWAC Coach of the Year for 2007.

In January 2008, the NCAA penalized Prairie View for NCAA rules violations committed by Cooper, reducing the number of scholarships for the team. The school was placed on four years' probation for "major violations" in 2005–2006 that ranged from Cooper giving players small amounts of cash to various forms of unauthorized practices. Cooper also gave players free tickets to Comets game, which is another NCAA infraction.

In five seasons at Prairie View, Cooper-Dyke had a cumulative 86–72 record.

UNC Wilmington (2010–2012)
On May 10, 2010, Cooper-Dyke was announced as the next head coach of the UNC Wilmington Seahawks Women's Basketball team. In Cooper-Dyke's first season, UNCW achieved an historic high in wins with a 24–9 record and appeared in the 2011 Women's National Invitation Tournament. Cooper-Dyke was the 2011 Colonial Athletic Association Coach of the Year, her third conference yearly honor of that sort.

First stint at Texas Southern (2012–2013)
On April 10, 2012, Cooper resigned from UNCW and became the head coach at Texas Southern. The 2012–13 Texas Southern team went 20–12 and appeared in the 2013 Women's National Invitation Tournament.

USC (2013–2017)
On April 11, 2013. Cooper returned to USC as head coach. In her first season, Cooper-Dyke led USC to a 22–13 (11–7 Pac-12) season with an appearance in the 2014 NCAA Division I women's basketball tournament. On March 3, 2017, Cooper-Dyke resigned as head coach at USC, following a 14–16 season in 2016–17 and 70–56 overall record.

Second stint at Texas Southern (2019–2022)
In April 2019, she returned to coach at Texas Southern. Texas Southern had a 20–10 record in her first season back but had two straight losing seasons afterwards at 5–10 and 11–15. Cooper-Dyke retired on March 17, 2022. She concluded her four seasons in two stints with a cumulative 56–47 record.

The Athletic reported on May 5, 2022 that Texas Southern opened a Title IX investigation into Cooper-Dyke over accusations of sexual harassment and verbal abuse. A hearing had been scheduled for April 6 but was canceled due to Cooper-Dyke no longer being employed by the university. Additional allegations of similar misconduct were revealed from her previous coaching jobs at UNC Wilmington and USC.

Halls of fame
Cooper was inducted into the Women's Basketball Hall of Fame in 2009. She was also announced as a member of the 2010 induction class of the Naismith Memorial Basketball Hall of Fame (the first WNBA player to be inducted), and was formally inducted on August 13 of that year.

Personal
Although born in Chicago, Illinois, Cooper-Dyke grew up in South Central Los Angeles, California. Cooper-Dyke is the daughter of Mary and Kenny Cooper. Her father left the family when she was only six years old, leaving her mother to raise eight children. Cooper-Dyke attended the University of Southern California and played on their women's basketball team for four years, winning NCAA championships in 1983 and 1984 with star teammate Cheryl Miller, but left in 1986 before earning a degree. She played on international women's basketball teams in Spain and Italy for a decade before returning to the US to play for the Houston Comets. While abroad she learned to speak Italian fluently.

In 2000, she published her autobiography, entitled She Got Game: My Personal Odyssey, which covered her childhood, her basketball career up to that time, and her mother's battle with breast cancer.

Her first marriage was on July 30, 1993 to Anthony Stewart in San Antonio, Texas. On April 28, 2001 she was married to Brian Dyke. She is a mother to twins – a son, Brian Jr., and a daughter, Cyan, born June 15, 2002.

After a successful college and professional basketball career, won four WNBA Championships and induction into the Basketball Hall of Fame, she turned to coaching. She began her coaching career in 2005 at Prairie View A&M University in Texas and guided the team to three SWAC Championships. While at the university, Cooper-Dyke turned student and coach and completed college requirements and earned a bachelor's degree in Health and Human Performance in 2010.

Head coaching record

WNBA

|-
| style="text-align:left;"|Phoenix
| style="text-align:left;"|2001
|32||13||19|||| align="center"|5th|||—||—||—||—
| style="text-align:center;"|—
|-
| style="text-align:left;"|Phoenix
| style="text-align:left;"|2002
|10||6||4|||| align="center"|(resigned)|||—||—||—||—
| style="text-align:center;"|—
|- class="sortbottom"
| align="center" colspan="2"|Career
|42||19||23|||| ||—||—||—||—||

College

Awards and achievements
 2x Ronchetti Cup (1990, 1993)
 2× WNBA MVP (1997, 1998)
 3× WNBA All-Star (1999, 2000, 2003)
 4× WNBA Champion (1997, 1998, 1999, 2000)
 4× WNBA Finals MVP (1997, 1998, 1999, 2000)
 WNBA Hall of Fame (2009)
 Women's Basketball Hall of Fame (2009)
 Basketball Hall of Fame (2010)
 CAA Coach of the Year (2010)
 WBCBL Professional Basketball Trailblazer Award (2015)

Notes

References

External links
 

1963 births
Living people
20th-century African-American sportspeople
20th-century African-American women
21st-century African-American sportspeople
21st-century African-American women
African-American basketball coaches
African-American basketball players
American expatriate basketball people in Italy
American expatriate basketball people in Spain
American women's basketball coaches
American women's basketball players
Basketball coaches from Illinois
Basketball players from Los Angeles
Basketball players at the 1987 Pan American Games
Basketball players at the 1988 Summer Olympics
Basketball players at the 1992 Summer Olympics
Basketball players from Chicago
Competitors at the 1986 Goodwill Games
Houston Comets players
Medalists at the 1987 Pan American Games
Medalists at the 1988 Summer Olympics
Medalists at the 1992 Summer Olympics
Naismith Memorial Basketball Hall of Fame inductees
Olympic bronze medalists for the United States in basketball
Olympic gold medalists for the United States in basketball
Pan American Games gold medalists for the United States
Pan American Games medalists in basketball
Phoenix Mercury coaches
Prairie View A&M Lady Panthers basketball coaches
Shooting guards
Texas Southern Tigers women's basketball coaches
UNC Wilmington Seahawks women's basketball coaches
United States women's national basketball team players
USC Trojans women's basketball coaches
USC Trojans women's basketball players
Women's National Basketball Association All-Stars